Jonathan "Jonty" Nicholas Emerson Griffiths (born 10 January 1995) is an English international field hockey player who plays as a defender or midfielder for England and Great Britain.

Early life
Griffiths was educated at Whitgift School and has previous played club hockey for Purley Walcountians, Oxted, Holcombe and Loughborough Students. He currently plays his club hockey for Loughborough Students in the National Premier League. He taught at City of London Freemen’s School and now at Whitgift School.

Professional career
Griffiths plays club hockey in the Men's England Hockey League for Surbiton. 
 
He played for England U-16,U-18 and U-21 levels. He was a regular player for England & GB U21s and was part of the team which won the Sultan of Johor Cup in October 2015. He also represented England U21s in the Junior World Cup in 2013 and won an U21 European Championships bronze medal in 2014.

References

1995 births
Living people
English male field hockey players
Wimbledon Hockey Club players
Men's England Hockey League players
Holcombe Hockey Club players
Loughborough Students field hockey players
Surbiton Hockey Club players